"Bra" is a song by British funk band Cymande from their self-titled debut studio album Cymande. Written by the group's members Patrick Patterson and Steve Scipio, it was recorded at De Lane Lea Studios in London, produced by John Schroeder, and released as a 7-inch single first in 1972 and then through Janus Records in 1973. Released as the second single from the album, the song peaked at No. 51 on the Soul Singles Billboard chart in the United States.

The song featured in Spike Lee's 1994 film Crooklyn as well as on its soundtrack album. It also appeared in John Jacobsen's 1998 film Around the Fire, Spike Lee's 2002 film 25th Hour, Martin Gero's 2007 film Young People Fucking, and The Worst Person in the World.

Track listing

Personnel 
 Ray King – vocals, percussion
 Peter Serreo – tenor saxophone
 Michael "Bami" Rose – alto saxophone, flute, bongos
 Pablo Gonsales – Congas
 Sam Kelly – drums
 Joey Dee – vocals, percussion
 Derek Gibbs – alto and soprano saxophone
 Steve Scipio – bass, songwriter
 Patrick Eaton Patterson – guitar, songwriter
 John Schroeder – producer

Charts

Sampled credits 
The song was sampled by several hip hop recording artists, including:

Sugarhill Gang in "Work, Work, the Body", released as a single (1985)
Gang Starr in "Movin' On" from No More Mr. Nice Guy (1989)
 Arabian Prince in "SItuation Critical" from Brother Arab (1989)
 De La Soul in "Change in Speak" from 3 Feet High and Rising (1989)
 Def Jef in "Give It Here" from Just a Poet with a Soul (1989)

It was more recently sampled in R&B artist Vivian Green's "Work" on her album Vivid (2015).

References

External links 

Funk songs
1973 singles
Song recordings produced by John Schroeder (musician)